The Serbian Hockey League Season for 2007-2008 consisted of 24 games. It started on October 12. HK Partizan won the regular division and the playoffs, making it their third title in a row.

Final standings

Playoffs

Semifinals
Partizan beat Zvezda 2-1
Novi Sad beat Vojvodina 2-1
.03.2008. Partizan - C.Zvezda 4:5 PS
11.03.2008. C.Zvezda - Partizan 2:5
15.03.2008. Partizan - C.Zvezda 3:2
09.03.2008. Novi Sad - Vojvodina 5:6
11.03.2008. Vojvodina - Novi Sad 3:5
15.03.2008. Novi Sad - Vojvodina 3:1

Finals
Partizan won 3-0
18.03.2008 Partizan - Novi Sad 7 : 4
21.03.2008 Novi Sad - Partizan 3 : 4
25.03.2008 Partizan - Novi Sad 7 : 4

3rd place
Zvezda won 2-1
18.03.2008 Vojvodina - C.Zvezda 3 : 1
21.03.2008 C.Zvezda - Vojvodina 4 : 2
25.03.2008 Vojvodina - C.Zvezda 2 : 3 PS

Schedule and results
 12.10.07 Novi Beograd - HK Beostar vs HK Vojvodina 4:1 (3:0, 1:0, 0:1)
 16.10.07 Beograd      - HK Partizan vs HK Crvena Zvezda 4:3 (3:1, 0:1, 1:1)
 16.10.07 Novi Sad   - HK Vojvodina vs HK Novi Sad
 19.10.07 Novi Sad   - HK Vojvodina vs HK Partizan 2:3 (0:0,2:0,0:2), OT
 19.10.07 Beograd     - HK Crvena Zvezda vs HK Novi Sad 4:6
 23.10.07 Novi Sad    - HK Novi Sad vs HK Partizan 4:3 PS (0:3,2:0,1:0,0:0,1:0)
 23.10.07 Beograd   - HK Crvena Zvezda vs HK Beostar 5:3
 26.10.07 Novi Beograd - HK Beostar vs  HK Novi Sad 1:6 (0:1,1:3,0:2)
 30.10.07 Novi Sad   - HK Vojvodina vs HK Beostar 1:0 (0:0,1:0,0:0)
 30.10.07 Beograd   - HK Crvena Zvezda vs HK Novi Sad 3:6 (0:1,1:1,2:4)
 02.11.07 Novi Sad   - HK Novi Sad vs HK Partizan 0:3 (0:1, 0:0, 0:2)
 02.11.07 Beograd   - HK Crvena Zvezda vs HK Beostar
 06.11.07 Novi Beograd - HK Beostar vs HK Novi Sad 4:7
 06.11.07 Novi Sad   - HK Vojvodina vs HK Partizan 2:5 (0:1,1:3,1:1)
 09.11.07 Beograd   - HK Crvena Zvezda vs HK Vojvodina 4:3 (1:1, 0:1, 3:1)
 09.11.07 Novi Beograd - HK Beostar vs HK Partizan 1:5 (0:2, 0:3, 1:0)
 16.11.07 Beograd   - HK Partizan vs HK Crvena Zvezda 10:2 (5:1, 3:0,2:1)
 20.11.07 Novi Beograd - HK Beostar vs HK Vojvodina 0:4
 20.11.07 Novi Sad   - HK Novi Sad vs HK Crvena Zvezda 3:5
 23.11.07 Novi Sad   - HK Novi Sad vs HK Vojvodina 5:3
 23.11.07 Novi Beograd - HK Beostar vs HK Partizan 3:6 (0:3,1:2,2:1)
 27.11.07 Beograd   - HK Crvena Zvezda HK Partizan 1:4 (0:2, 0:1, 1:1)
 27.11.07 Novi Sad     - HK Novi Sad vs HK Vojvodina 4:3 SO (0:0,2:3,1:0,1:0)
 30.11.07 Novi Sad     - HK Vojvodina vs HK Crvena Zvezda 5:2
 04.12.07 Novi Sad     - HK Novi Sad vs HK Beostar  6:3
 04.12.07 Beograd     - HK Partizan vs HK Vojvodina 4:5 (1:2,2:1,1:2)
 07.12.07 Beograd     - HK Partizan vs HK Novi Sad 4:5 (1:3, 2:0, 1:2)
 07.12.07 Novi Beograd - HK Beostar vs HK Crvena Zvezda 1:0 (1:0; 0:0; 0:0)
 11.12.07 Novi Sad     - HK Vojvodina vs HK Crvena Zvezda
 11.12.07 Beograd     - HK Partizan vs HK Beostar 7:1 (4:0, 2:1, 1:0)
 14.12.07 Beograd     - HK Partizan vs HK Novi Sad 7:6 (2:2, 5:2, 0:2)
 14.12.07 Novi Beograd - HK Beostar vs HK Crvena Zvezda 2:3 (1:2; 1:0; 0:0; 0:0, 0:1) SO
 18.12.07 Novi Sad     - HK Vojvodina vs HK Beostar 3:0 (0:0,1:0,2:0)
 18.12.07 Beograd     - HK Crvena Zvezda vs HK Novi Sad 4:5 (2:0,2:1,0:4)
 21.12.07 Novi Sad     - HK Vojvodina vs HK Beostar 2:1
 04.01.08 Beograd     - HK Partizan vs HK Vojvodina
 04.01.08 Novi Sad     - HK Novi Sad vs HK Crvena Zvezda 2:4 (2:2,0:2,0:0)
 08.01.08 Novi Sad     - HK Novi Sad vs HK Partizan 1:3 (1:2, 0:0, 0:1)
 08.01.08 Beograd     - HK Crvena Zvezda vs HK Beostar 4:1
 11.01.08 Novi Sad   - HK Novi Sad vs HK Beostar
 15.01.08 Novi Beograd - HK Beostar vs HK Novi Sad
 15.01.08 Novi Sad   - HK Vojvodina vs HK Partizan
 25.01.08 Beograd   - HK Partizan vs HK Crvena Zvezda 2:8 (1:2,0:4,1:2)
 25.01.08 Novi Sad   - HK Vojvodina vs HK Novi Sad 3:4 (2:2,1:2,0:0)
 29.01.08 Beograd   - HK Crvena Zvezda vs HK Vojvodina 5:4 (0:0,2:2,3:2)
 29.01.08 Novi Beograd - HK Beostar vs HK Partizan 1:2 OT
 01.02.08 Beograd   - HK Crvena Zvezda vs HK Partizan 4:5 (1:2,0:1,3:2)
 05.02.08 Novi Sad     - HK Vojvodina vs HK Novi Sad 2:3 OT (0:1,0:1,2:0,0:1)
 05.02.08 Beograd     - HK Partizan vs HK Beostar 5:1 (2:0,0:1, 3:0)
 08.02.08 Novi Beograd - HK Beostar vs HK Vojvodina
 08.02.08 Novi Sad     - HK Novi Sad vs HK Crvena Zvezda 4:1 (2:0,1:0,1:1)
 12.02.08 Novi Sad     - HK Novi Sad vs HK Beostar 11:2
 12.02.08 Beograd     - HK Partizan vs HK Vojvodina 1:5 (0:1, 1:1, 0:3)
 15.02.08 Beograd     - HK Crvena Zvezda vs HK Vojvodina 0:8 (0:1,0:4,0:3)
 19.02.08 Novi Sad     - HK Vojvodina vs HK Crvena Zvezda
 19.02.08 Beograd     - HK Partizan vs HK Beostar 5:2 (1:0, 1:2, 3:0)
 22.02.08 Beograd     - HK Partizan vs HK Novi Sad 3:1 (1:0, 0:0, 2:1)
 22.02.08 Novi Beograd - HK Beostar vs HK Crvena Zvezda
 26.02.08 Beograd     - HK Crvena Zvezda vs HK Partizan 2:4 (0:1, 2:1, 0:2)
 26.02.08 Novi Sad     - HK Novi Sad vs HK Vojvodina 3:6
 Some additional games were played, to make up for games that got canceled. Results may be added at a later time to the list.

Serbian Hockey League
Serbian Hockey League seasons
Serb